Joyland is a 2022 Urdu and Punjabi-language Pakistani drama film written and directed by Saim Sadiq in his feature film directorial debut. The film stars Ali Junejo, Rasti Farooq, Alina Khan, Sarwat Gilani, and Salmaan Peerzada. It centers on the Rana family, whose patriarch yearns for the birth of another boy.

It had its world premiere at the 2022 Cannes Film Festival on 23 May 2022 in Un Certain Regard, where it competed for the Caméra d'Or. Joyland is the first Pakistani film to premiere at 
Cannes Film Festival and it received a standing ovation after its screening, and also won Jury Prize and Queer Palm prize for best LGBTQ, queer or feminist theme movie at the festival.

The film was released in Pakistan on 18 November 2022. It was selected as the Pakistani entry for  Best International Feature Film at 95th Academy Awards. On 21 December 2022, it became the first Pakistani film to be shortlisted in the category.

Synopsis
In inner-city Lahore, a severe patriarch (Salmaan Peerzada) is the head of the middle-class Rana family, which includes his two sons, daughters-in-law, and four granddaughters. He wants his children to give him a grandson and forces his daughter-in-law Mumtaz (Rasti Farooq) to quit her job after Haider (Ali Junejo), his younger son and her husband, finds work at an erotic dance theater. But all changes when Haider falls in love with Biba, a transgender dancer (Alina Khan).

Cast
 Ali Junejo as Haider
 Rasti Farooq as Mumtaz
 Alina Khan as Biba
 Sarwat Gilani as Nucchi
 Salmaan Peerzada as Rana Amanullah
 Sohail Sameer as Saleem
 Sania Saeed as Fayyaz

Release

Screening
The film had its world premiere at the 75th Cannes Film Festival  in the Un Certain Regard section on 23 May 2022. Film Constellation, a U.K. and France-based sales firm, has taken up the international rights for the film, which will be shared with WME Independent for representation in North America. French rights of the film were acquired by Condor.

The film was invited at 2022 Toronto International Film Festival in 'Special Presentations' section and was screened on 8 September 2022. It also made it to 'A Window on Asian Cinema' section of 27th Busan International Film Festival and was screened on October 6, 2022. Later in December, it was invited to the 28th Kolkata International Film Festival and was screened on 18 December 2022. In the same month, it was also invited to 'Spotlight' section of 2023 Sundance Film Festival to be held from January 19 to 29, 2023.

Theatrical
The film was scheduled to be released in Pakistan on 18 November 2022. However, Pakistan's Ministry of Information and Broadcasting banned its release on account of the country's Motion Picture Ordinance, 1979. This decision was reversed on November 16, clearing the way for domestic screenings of the film, after censoring several "objectionable erotic" scenes.

Controversies
Despite the critical acclaim Joyland received, and the censor board having granted the film a censor certificate in August, the Pakistan government banned its domestic release in November. The country’s Ministry of Information & Broadcasting said that it had received written complaints about the film. Following a campaign by the country’s right-wing party Jamaat-e-Islami, one of the party’s senators, Senator Mushtaq Ahmed Khan, accused the film of being “against Pakistani values”.  He further added, “Glamourising transgenders in Pakistan, as well as their love affairs, is a direct attack on our beliefs.”
 
The ban was met with harsh criticism, with the hashtag #ReleaseJoyland making rounds on social media.  In an Instagram post, director Saim Sadiq wrote that he and his team were “gutted” by the ban and said it was, ”absolutely unconstitutional and illegal.” Alina Khan, the actress playing the protagonist of the film, said, “There’s nothing against Islam and I don’t understand how Islam can get endangered by mere films.”  In a written defense published in Variety, Nobel Prize winner Malala Yousafzai, who is also an executive producer of the film, wrote, “Joyland is also (sic) a love letter to Pakistan, to its culture, food, fashion and, most of all, its people. How tragic that a film created by and for Pakistanis is now banned from our screens because of claims that it does not “represent our way of life” or “portrays a negative image of our country.” The opposite is true — the film reflects reality for millions of ordinary Pakistanis, people who yearn for freedom and fulfilment, people who create moments of joy every day for those they love.

An aide to Prime Minister Shahbaz Sharif told Associated Press that a committee formed to evaluate the film approved its release with minor cuts. On November 16, the ban was reversed, allowing the film to go ahead with its original Pakistan release date of November 18.

It remains banned in the Punjab province.

Notably, Joyland didn’t screen at the International Film Festival of Kerala, one of India’s most well-respected film festivals. In a report for Firstpost, journalist Anna M. M. Vetticad revealed that the film was rejected by the artistic director of the festival, Deepika Suseelan. The article quotes Suseelan as saying, “There are actually so many films dealing with the same (sic), particularly transgender if we take out, you know there is lesbian, gay, different segments (…) For me personally, I liked Paloma more, and for me, Joyland was taking too much time.” Vetticad wrote, “It is inexcusable (…) for an individual in such a critical position to consider their personal opinion reason enough to reject such a film despite its cultural and socio-political significance; to be unaware of that significance and equally unaware of audience interest in it despite the crowds it has drawn at festivals across the world.”

Reception

Critical response
The film received widespread critical acclaim from international critics. It received a standing ovation at the Cannes Film Festival premiere.  On Metacritic, it has a weighted average score of 79 out of 100 based on 11 critics, indicating "generally favorable reviews".

India
On the occasion of the film's India premiere, Anna M.M. Vetticad wrote on Firstpost: "In these divisive times, it is worth pondering over the many commonalities between our two countries – our failings included – as are reflected in this wonderfully sensitive chronicle of friendship and love, longing and loneliness, sexuality, desire, enforced gender roles, and the everydayness behind which prejudice, repression and oppression thrive." Vetticad added: "In contrast to the cacophony of tyranny and persecution accompanying Haider, Mumtaz and Biba’s journey, the film ... runs as smoothly as a symphony in motion."

Siddhant Adlakha of IndieWire graded the film as B+ and wrote, "The frame moves slowly, if at all, but it always brims with physical and emotional energy; there’s always something in the ether, whether embodied by dazzling displays of light as characters move across stages and club floors or by breathtaking silences."

In National Herald, Namrata Joshi wrote that the film has been crafted on the "power of the implicit". Joshi praised "virtuoso cast", writing, "each character, irrespective of her or his length of stay on screen, is imbued with a rare completeness, and brought alive by meticulous, effortless performance". Concluding her review, she stated, "Joyland begins with a birth, a sense of hope and possibility but leaves one with a tremendous sense of loss." Next she brought out the pathos of the film writing, "The circle of life is communicated with tenderness and poise by Sadiq that makes it doubly poignant."

Anupama Chopra reviewing the film, praised the performances of ensemble writing, "The actors - Ali Junejo , Salmaan Peerzada , Sarwat Gilani, Sania Saeed, and Alina Khan - deliver emotionally resonant performances." Chopra concluded, "With poetry and abiding melancholy, Joyland creates a poignant portrait of a splintered family". Shubhra Gupta of The Indian Express found Joyland "the Pakistan’s first official entry, heartwarming ..."

International
Lovia Gyarkye of The Hollywood Reporter, reviewing the film described it as a "family saga, one that [the director] Sadiq uses to observe how gender norms constrict, and then asphyxiate, individuals". In his bottom line comment, Gyarkye termed Joyland as "An aching consideration of gender and sexuality."

Anna Smith of Deadline Hollywood Daily opined that the film "has a vivid sense of place, created not so much by its geographical backdrop as its characters." Smith concluding her review wrote, Joyland remains a thoughtful, well performed and engrossing drama set in a culture that’s shifting, and not always with ease."

Allan Hunter of Screen Daily wrote, "Sadiq’s screenplay navigates a complex web of secrets and lies, pressures and prejudices to create a soulful human drama intent on challenging narrow minds." Hunter opined that "there are no real villains here beyond a society that imposes rigid expectations on individuals and genders" so, Hunter believed that "liberation carries a hefty price in Joyland, especially for the women," he further felt that "Sadiq’s engaging, thought-provoking film is fully aware of the sacrifices made and the struggles that still lie ahead."

Film critic Jason Gorber, reviewing at Cannes festival, appreciated the film stating, "Expect this to be an absolute breakthrough from this year's Cannes 2022 with enormous international attention." Gorber found the film "Profound and powerful" and further stated, "Pakistani drama upends all expectation of cinema from that often closed culture, one that brashly looks at love, family, longing in its myriad forms.

Ryan Leston of Slash Film rated the film with 7 out of 10 and praised the director Saim Sadiq for his subtle approach to the film. Leston appreciated the film calling it, "a wonderful film about longing and desire with a melancholy undertone that you just don't expect." Concluding review Leston observed, "Joyland is a profoundly moving film that might just make a difference."

Guy Lodge of Variety found the film "tartly funny and plungingly sad in equal measure," and opined that, "as a tale of transgender desire in a Muslim country, its very premise makes it a boundary-breaker." Appreciating the director, Lodge wrote, "Sadiq's debut impresses with its sensitive storytelling and vibrant visuals."

For Davide Abbatescianni, of The New Arab, the picture "deserves wide praise, especially considering the troubled socio-cultural context in which it was shot." Moreover, "it prompts important questions about chasing dreams and discovering our true selves."

Accolades

See also
 List of submissions to the 95th Academy Awards for Best International Feature Film
 List of Pakistani submissions for the Academy Award for Best International Feature Film

References

External links
 
 

2022 films
Pakistani drama films
Punjabi-language Pakistani films
2020s Urdu-language films
Pakistani LGBT-related films
Films set in Lahore
2022 directorial debut films
2022 LGBT-related films
Film controversies in Pakistan
Films about trans women
Queer Palm winners